Andrew Restrepo (born October 8, 1970) is a retired American soccer defender who played one season with the MetroStars in Major League Soccer. He is currently a volunteer assistant coach for the University of Tampa men's team.

Restrepo played college soccer at Lees McRae in 1989 and 1990 then transferred to University of South Florida in 1991 and 1992.  In 1993, Restrepo signed with the Orlando Lions in the USISL.  He remained with the Lions through the 1994 season.  In the spring of 1995, he signed with the Tampa Bay Cyclones.  He then moved to Colombia in the fall of 1995 where he played for Condor and then Club Santa Fe.  In February 1996, the MetroStars selected Restreppo in the 13th round (129th overall) of the 1996 MLS Inaugural Player Draft.  He played five games for the MetroStars before being waived.  On April 22, 1997, he signed with the New Orleans Riverboat Gamblers.   In 1998, the Gamblers became known as the New Orleans Storm.  Restrepo remained with the team through the 1998 seasons.  In 1999, Restrepo moved to the Rochester Rhinos where they became the first, and as of 2022, only non-Division I team to win the 1999 U.S. Open Cup since the inception of Major League Soccer, defeating four MLS teams in the tournament. .  On June 12, 2001, the Rhinos sent Restrepo to the Atlanta Silverbacks as part of a three-way deal which sent Steve Armas to the Minnesota Thunder and Stoian Mladenov to the Rhinos.  He finished the season in Atlanta, playing 15 games.  In 2008, he played for the Clearwater Galactics in the 2008 U.S. Open Cup.

References

External links

MetroFanatic player profile

1970 births
Living people
American expatriate soccer players
American soccer players
Soccer players from Connecticut
Sportspeople from Bridgeport, Connecticut
Atlanta Silverbacks players
Major League Soccer players
New York Red Bulls players
New Orleans Riverboat Gamblers players
Orlando Lions (1992–1996) players
South Florida Bulls men's soccer players
Tampa Bay Cyclones players
Rochester New York FC players
USISL players
St. Petersburg Kickers players
Association football defenders
Tampa Spartans men's soccer coaches